Montpellier Sud de France station (French: Gare de Montpellier Sud de France) is a railway station on the outskirts of Montpellier, France which offers TGV services.

Montpellier Sud de France was built for and opened in 2018 a few months after the Nîmes – Montpellier Bypass, which extends from the end of the LGV Méditerranée near Nîmes, Gard to just beyond Montpellier, Hérault.

Station

Montpellier Sud de France has four platforms and six tracks.  The 1st, 3rd, 4th and 6th tracks allow train access to the platforms and the 2nd and 5th tracks are used by passing traffic (the Contournement Nîmes – Montpellier is also used by freight traffic).

Autoroute 709 (a branch of the A9) provides road access to the station.

The station is situated at the edge of Montpellier near the Château de la Mogère

Train services
Termini of TGV services to and from the station include Paris Gare de Lyon, Brussels-South, Lyon-Part-Dieu, Luxembourg, Toulouse-Matabiau, Nantes, Lille (both Europe and Flandres), Perpignan, and Béziers.

The fastest travel time between Paris and Montpellier Sud de France is 3 h 4 m.

Bus services
 Place de France, Montpellier

References

External links
 
 

Railway stations in Hérault
Railway stations in France opened in 2018
TGV